The 2010–2011 Israel Football League season was the fourth season of the Israel Football League (IFL). The league expanded to eight teams with the expansion team Herzliya Hammers and was divided in two divisions: North and South.

Regular season 
The regular season consisted of ten games for each team. Two games (home and away) against each team within the same division, and one game against each of the teams from the other division.

Playoffs

Wild Card games 
 North
 Pioneers 50 – 16 Hammers
 South
 Rebels 44 – 12 Black Swarm

Division Championships 
 North
 Sabres 26 – 16 Pioneers
 South
 Lions 42 – 46 Rebels

Israel Bowl IV 
Sabres 30 – 32 Rebels

Awards 

 Most Valuable Player: Alex Swieca, QB, Judean Rebels
 Offensive Player-of-the-Year: Itay Ashkenazi, QB, Jerusalem Lions
 Defensive Player-of-the-Year: Jeremy Sable, LB, Tel Aviv/Jaffa Sabres
 Coach-of-the-Year: Betzalel Friedman, Judean Rebels
 Rookie-of-the-Year: Sagan Zavelo, DB, Tel Aviv Pioneers
 Newcomer-of-the-Year: Jenya Gluzman, DL, Tel Aviv Pioneers

References

Israel Football League Seasons